Secularity, also the secular or secularness (from Latin saeculum, "worldly" or "of a generation"), is the state of being unrelated or neutral in regards to religion. Anything that does not have an explicit reference to religion, either negatively or positively, may be considered secular. Linguistically, a process by which anything becomes secular is named secularization, though the term is mainly reserved for the secularization of society; and any concept or ideology promoting the secular may be termed secularism, a term generally applied to the ideology dictating no religious influence on the public sphere.

Definitions

Historically, the word secular was not related or linked to religion, but was a freestanding term in Latin which would relate to any mundane endeavour. However, the term, saecula saeculorum (saeculōrum being the genitive plural of saeculum) as found in the New Testament in the Vulgate translation (circa 410) of the original Koine Greek phrase  (eis toùs aionas ton aiṓnōn), e.g. at Galatians 1:5, was used in the early Christian church (and is still used today), in the doxologies, to denote the coming and going of the ages, the grant of eternal life, and the long duration of created things from their beginning to forever and ever.  Secular and secularity derive from the Latin word saeculum which meant "of a generation, belonging to an age" or denoted a period of about one hundred years. The Christian doctrine that God exists outside time led medieval Western culture to use secular to indicate separation from specifically religious affairs and involvement in temporal ones.

Modern and historical understandings of the term

"Secular" does not necessarily imply hostility or rejection of God or religion, though some use the term this way (see "secularism", below); Martin Luther used to speak of "secular work" as a vocation from God for most Christians. According to cultural anthropologists such as Jack David Eller, secularity is best understood, not as being "anti-religious", but as being "religiously neutral" since many activities in religious bodies are secular themselves and most versions of secularity do not lead to irreligiosity.

The idea of a dichotomy between religion and the secular originated in the European Enlightenment. Furthermore, since religion and secular are both Western concepts that were formed under the influence of Christian theology, other cultures do not necessarily have words or concepts that resemble or are equivalent to them.

One can regard eating and bathing as examples of secular activities, because there may not be anything inherently religious about them. Nevertheless, some religious traditions see both eating and bathing as sacraments, therefore making them religious activities within those world views. Saying a prayer derived from religious text or doctrine, worshipping through the context of a religion, performing corporal and spiritual works of mercy, and attending a religious seminary school or monastery are examples of religious (non-secular) activities.

In many cultures, there is little dichotomy between "natural" and "supernatural", "religious" and "not-religious", especially since people have beliefs in other supernatural or spiritual things irrespective of belief in God or gods. Other cultures stress practice of ritual rather than belief. Conceptions of both "secular" and "religious", while sometimes having some parallels in local cultures, were generally imported along with Western worldviews, often in the context of colonialism. Attempts to define either the "secular" or the "religious" in non-Western societies, accompanying local modernization and Westernization processes, were often and still are fraught with tension. Due to all these factors, "secular" as a general term of reference was much deprecated in social sciences, and is used carefully and with qualifications.

Taylorian secularity

Philosopher Charles Taylor in his 2007 book A Secular Age understands and discusses the secularity of Western societies less in terms of how much of a role religion plays in public life (secularity 1), or how religious a society's individual members are (secularity 2), than as a "backdrop" or social context in which religious belief is no longer taken as a given (secularity 3). For Taylor, this third sense of secularity is the unique historical condition in which virtually all individuals - religious or not - have to contend with the fact that their values, morality, or sense of life's meaning are no longer underpinned by communally-accepted religious facts. All religious beliefs or irreligious philosophical positions are, in a secular society, held with an awareness that there are a wide range of other contradictory positions available to any individual; belief in general becomes a different type of experience when all particular beliefs are optional. A plethora of competing religious and irreligious worldviews open up, each rendering the other more "fragile". This condition in turn entails for Taylor that even clearly religious beliefs and practices are experienced in a qualitatively different way when they occur in a secular social context. In Taylor's sense of the term, a society could in theory be highly "secular" even if nearly all of its members believed in a deity or even subscribed to a particular religious creed; secularity here has to do with the conditions, not the prevalence, of belief, and these conditions are understood to be shared across a given society, irrespective of belief or lack thereof.

Taylor's thorough account of secularity as a socio-historical condition, rather than the absence or diminished importance of religion, has been highly influential in subsequent philosophy of religion and sociology of religion, particularly as older sociological narratives about secularisation, desecularisation, and disenchantment have come under increased criticism.

References

Footnotes

Bibliography

Further reading

External links
 

Religion and society
Social concepts